The Peninsula Commute, also known as the Southern Pacific Peninsula or just Peninsula, was the common name for commuter rail service between San Jose, California and San Francisco, California on the San Francisco Peninsula. This service ran as a private, for-profit enterprise beginning in 1863. Due to operating losses, the Southern Pacific Railroad (SP) petitioned to discontinue the service in 1977. Subsidies were provided through the California Department of Transportation (Caltrans) in 1980 to continue service, and it was renamed Caltrain.

History
Since 1863 the San Francisco Peninsula, the series of towns (and later, cities) between San Francisco and San Jose, has been served by a railroad. The San Francisco and San Jose Railroad first provided freight and passenger service, followed by its successor, the Southern Pacific, and then briefly by the California Department of Transportation (Caltrans) and finally by a regional Joint Powers Board which runs today's passenger trains.

San Francisco–San Jose Railroad

Although a line had been proposed in the past, construction on the railroad between San Francisco and San Jose was started in 1860 "by a group of local capitalists of more than ordinary energy and resources" under the auspices of the San Francisco and San Jose Rail Road (SF&SJ), and completed in 1863. The Central Pacific Railroad transferred its rights for the construction of the right-of-way between San Jose and Sacramento to the Western Pacific Railroad (WPRR, which was founded by the same members that had founded the SF&SJ) in late 1862. 

In December 1865, the Southern Pacific Railroad Company (SP) was incorporated to build a rail line between San Francisco and San Diego. By the end of 1868, it was revealed the Big Four of the Central Pacific consisting of Stanford, Huntington, Hopkins, and Crocker had a controlling interest in the SF&SJ and SP, and the SF&SJ, SP, the Santa Clara and Pajaro Valley Railroad, and the California Southern were folded into a consolidated Southern Pacific Railroad on October 12, 1870.

Under Southern Pacific

Under Southern Pacific the line was double tracked in 1904, and multiple cutoffs were built over a period ending in 1910. The first of these, the Bayshore Cutoff, opened in 1907 and rerouted the line through a series of five tunnels built along the shoreline of San Francisco Bay. This saved approximately three miles and seventeen minutes compared to the prior route, which veered to the west around San Bruno Mountain. The Bayshore Cutoff also eliminated the use of helper engines to bring trains over the mountain. The second, the Mayfield Cutoff, opened in 1908 to provide service to western Santa Clara Valley cities such as Los Altos and Los Gatos. The third, the Dumbarton Cutoff, opened in 1910 and included the first bridge across San Francisco Bay, between Newark and Menlo Park, saving many miles to Oakland and Sacramento compared to the prior route through San Jose and Santa Clara.

The Peninsula Electric Railroad was incorporated around the same time the Dumbarton Cutoff project was launched, and it was suspected that it was controlled by Southern Pacific in preparation for a quad-track expansion, as it was laying a route parallel with the Southern Pacific. As envisioned in 1909 from plans for the Peninsula Electric, SP announced that it would investigate the electrification of its Peninsula Commute line in September 1921, promising better and more frequent service. Just a few days later, SP cited excessive post-war inflation, taxation, and competition from publicly funded highways as factors making electrification neither "practicable or desirable". Similarly, plans to eliminate all at-grade crossings were announced in 1909, but not carried to completion. As Southern Pacific's franchise to operate on 4th Street in San Jose was ending, it elected to build a diversion track to the west. This line forced a move for the city's passenger traffic to a new station at Cahill, placing it one mile from downtown (whereas it had previously been a four-block distance).

SP's Peninsula Commute experienced record ridership during World War II. During the war, 26 trains ran between San Jose and San Francisco per day, with headways as low as 5 minutes (traveling north) in the mornings and 3 minutes (traveling south) in the evenings. In 1954, surveys comparing traffic on Bayshore Highway with train traffic concluded that just over half of all commuters to San Francisco passing through Brisbane were taking the train, and that eight more lanes would need to be added to the freeway to accommodate traffic if rail service were to stop suddenly.

However, in the period after the war, Peninsula roads were improved; the four-lane undivided Bayshore Highway (completed in 1925) was rebuilt into a six-lane divided freeway between 1949 and 1962, and Interstate 280 was completed in the 1970s. Train ridership declined with the rise of automobile use, falling from a peak of 9.2 million annual boardings in 1954 (approximately 16,000 weekday riders) to 4.4 million in 1977 (approximately 7,000 weekday riders). 

During peak hours, Peninsula Commute trains operated with headways as low as three or four minutes; however, with skip-stop and express train service patterns, the minimum wait for riders at a given station would be ten minutes. During off-peak hours, service frequencies dropped to longer than two hours between trains.

On several occasions during the 1960s and 1970s, SP attempted to discontinue the commute service due to increasing deficits and stagnant ridership. Ridership was 11,500 daily passengers on 22 trains in 1970, compared to 12,000 daily passengers in 1967 and 10,000 daily passengers in 1946. In 1971, when Amtrak took over long distance passenger operations, Southern Pacific's extended commute train to Monterey, California, the "Del Monte", was discontinued. Some SP passenger locomotives were sold to Amtrak and the remainder were transferred to Peninsula Commute service, which continued to operate. In 1975, the Metropolitan Transportation Commission (MTC) published the Feasibility of Upgrading Peninsula Passenger Rail Service (PERSUS) report.

The CPUC authorized a 25% increase in fares in a 3–2 vote on July 12, 1977, effective August 1977. Because the CPUC decision process was so slow, SP President Benjamin Biaggini offered to purchase 1,000 eight-passenger vans and donate them for vanpools in exchange for permanently discontinuing the Peninsula Commute service. 

On May 6, 1977, SP formally filed a petition with the CPUC (Application No. 57289) to discontinue the commuter operation due to ongoing losses. At that time, SP was running 44 trains a day. The petition was opposed by regional transit agencies, including the MTC, who passed Resolution No. 479 to request the CPUC deny the SP petition. On October 17, 1977, the administrative law judge issued an order asking "Who will pay the cost of this regional insurance against the uncertainties of tomorrow? In the interim period, CALTRANS, the Metropolitan Transportation Commission, and the three counties involved are directed to meet, consult, and plan toward whether they will be willing to obtain funds under the provisions of the Urban Mass Transportation Act and their own resources to meet the operating deficit of Southern Pacific's commute and transit operations." 

Since the CPUC had not taken action on the petition 120 days after the filing, SP filed another petition to discontinue service with the Interstate Commerce Commission (ICC) on November 17, 1977. Although the CPUC denied the SP application on April 19, 1978, jurisdiction had already passed to ICC.

State administration and Caltrain

In response to the CPUC petition, Assemblymember Lou Papan wrote Assembly Bill 1853, which allowed local transit districts served by the Peninsula Commute to purchase tickets from SP at face value and sell them to riders at a discount, subsidizing passengers. AB 1853 also allowed the California Department of Transportation (Caltrans) to negotiate with SP for operation of the commuter rail service and the purchase of the right-of-way between Daly City and San Bruno, which had only seen occasional freight traffic since the completion of the Bayshore Cutoff in 1907. Preservation of rail service was seen as critical to ensuring traffic would continue to flow, as both the Bayshore Freeway and I-280 were nearing capacity; and to preserve air quality in the region. The right-of-way between Daly City and San Bruno was seen as key to a planned extension of BART to San Francisco International Airport, an extension that eventually opened in 2003.

The recommendations of the 1977 Peninsula Transit Alternatives Project (PENTAP) Report (mandated by the Legislature in 1975 by SB 283) were used to draft AB 1853. PENTAP recommended that train and bus service be improved, fixed rail transit facilities be better utilized in the near future, and facilities and options should be preserved for long-range expansion and modernization. MTC passed Resolution No. 411 in 1977, proposing a three-phased approach:
 Maintain existing service levels, by subsidizing passenger fares and improving the SP interface with MUNI
 Improve service levels and standards, by entering into a "purchase of service" contract with a rail operator (SP) and defining service based on regional transit requirements, not operator needs or profits
 Expand rail service

In a December 1977 public hearing before the Assembly Committee on Transportation held in San Jose, SP executive Alan DeMoss testified that "rail commute service should no longer be cross-subsidized by other railroad activities" and offered $8 million to help purchase buses to replace the service. However, both samTrans and the Santa Clara County Transit District stated they would not be able to operate that bus service; it was estimated that a fleet of 122 buses would be required, arriving and departing from San Francisco every 35 to 50 seconds. Testifying later at that same hearing, samTrans chair John Mauro pointed out that since the inception of the San Mateo County bus service in 1975, service to San Francisco was deliberately crippled in speed to avoid competing with the rail service. Mauro had previously tried to negotiate with SP to enter a "purchase of service" contract in March 1976, but SP refused to accept a direct subsidy, which led to the passenger fare subsidy instead. During that hearing, the committee chair, Walter Ingalls, stated bluntly the state was not "going to authorize either Sam Trans or Santa Clara County or San Francisco County or any of the three to buy and operate a railroad. [...] No one's going to offer to buy your railroad." SP had previously offered to sell MTC a single track along the right-of-way between San Bruno and San Jose in December 1975, which could have been used to extend BART, but the offer was not taken. 

Ridership increased during 1979 and 1980, aided by the gasoline crisis and fare subsidies; the Peninsula Commute was so sensitive to gasoline prices that ridership jumped by 40% in May and June 1979. SP's ICC petition received a preliminary affirmative ruling from the administrative law judge in July 1979. In the first fiscal year, covering 1980–81, operating costs were $19.33 million and fare revenue was $7.81 million, resulting in a farebox recovery ratio of 43%. The deficit was covered by a mix of Urban Mass Transportation Act funds ($2 million), contributions from SP ($400,000), and the state and three counties served ($4.56 million each). During state administration, Caltrans purchased new locomotives and cars that replaced the SP equipment in 1985 and provided push-pull service (removing the need to turn locomotives around at terminals), upgraded stations, introduced shuttle buses to nearby employers, and renamed the operation Caltrain. Southern Pacific continued to operate the service under contract to Caltrans. However, ridership continued to decline and the farebox recovery ratio fell to 34.3% in the 1983–84 fiscal year, which violated the minimum of 40% set by AB 1010 in 1982.

By 1988, the service was the only operating commuter rail in California. The state felt that regional control of the Peninsula Commute was more appropriate, as it was primarily a benefit to the region, not the state. The PCJB then contracted operations to Amtrak, ending 122 years of operation by Southern Pacific. TransitAmerica Services took over operations in 2012.

Rolling stock
SP took over the Peninsula Corridor route from the SF&SJ in 1870 and assumed control of the existing set of locomotives and passenger cars, which were mainly 4-4-0 steam engines and 36-passenger wooden railcars. As SP began introducing diesel locomotives on its long-distance (main-line) routes, steam engines were moved into Peninsula Commute service, culminating in the use of the large "General Service" 4-8-4 locomotives which served the Peninsula Corridor through 1957. Diesel-electric Fairbanks-Morse Train Masters had been running in Peninsula Commute service since 1954. Fairbanks-Morse and, later, EMD diesels served the Peninsula Commute past 1980, when the state-run CalTrain began assuming financial responsibility for the service, and were not retired until 1985, when the state purchased new EMD F40PH locomotives. One of the factors driving the purchase of new locomotives was the dramatic increase in annual lease costs in 1985.

Locomotives
Steam

With population (and ridership) growth on the Peninsula, the initial mix of 4-4-0, 2-6-0, and 4-4-2 locomotives were replaced by 4-6-0s. Older locomotives were redesignated to Commute service after they were displaced by newer locomotives assuming main-line (long-distance, inter-city) passenger service. Pacific-type 4-6-2s were used on peak-hour commutes by the 1930s and 1940s, displacing 4-6-0s, and more 4-6-2s were made available for the Commute by the introduction of 4-8-2s in main-line service; by 1945, the 4-8-2s were displacing 4-6-2s on peak-hour trains, 4-6-2s were moved to off-peak service, and 4-6-0s were used on weekend trains. By the early 1950s, peak-hour trains were pulling up to seventeen cars in a single consist, requiring the use of the "General Service" class 4-8-4s.

After gaining experience with diesel engines in main-line service, SP began testing various diesel locomotives for the Peninsula Commute, finally selecting the Fairbanks-Morse H-24-66 "Train Master" because the relatively short distance between stations meant acceleration (and power) was the paramount priority. The final steam-led Peninsula Commute train departed San Francisco for San Jose on January 22, 1957, led by 4-8-4 No. 4430. However, 4-6-2 No. 2472 was moved from San Francisco to San Jose at the head of Caltrain #74 on December 16, 1994; #2472 was to lead a special charity excursion train back to San Francisco the next day. While coupled to Caltrain #74, though, #2472 was used to help accelerate the train out of each station, so it was not just a cosmetic appearance. #2472 has since been used occasionally along the Peninsula Corridor for special service, but not while providing revenue passenger service.

Diesel

The first diesel on the Peninsula Commute ran on September 28, 1953, using SP Locomotive No. 5325, an EMD SD7 equipped with a steam boiler; it left the shortly thereafter, as the SD7 was unable to match the performance of the 4-6-2 steam locomotives then being used for off-peak and weekend service. 

SP began testing Fairbanks-Morse (F-M) "Train Master" H-24-66 locomotives in late 1953, and purchased two of the four demonstrator models for use on the Peninsula Commute service. Because the existing "Suburban" and "Harriman" passenger cars then prevalent in the fleet took steam heat from the locomotive boiler, SP passenger diesel engines were equipped with steam generators. The diesel era of the Peninsula Commute began on August 25, 1954, when two Train Masters went into test service.

The Train Masters were complemented by a fleet of EMD GP9s fitted with steam generators; while peak-hour trains required one Train Master or two GP9s, off-peak and weekend trains could more economically use a single GP9. Switching duties were handled by an ALCO RS-32, or an ALCO S-4. When Amtrak took over inter-city (main-line) service in 1971, the SP EMD SDP45s then in main-line use were reassigned to Commute service, and three unique passenger-equipped EMD GP40P-2 engines were delivered in 1974, allowing SP to retire all of the Train Masters by 1975. The fleet of EMD GP9s, SDP45s, and GP40P-2s were used by SP to run the Peninsula Commute.

In 1978, SP pulled the SDP45s from Peninsula Commute service to comply with an ICC order to return freight cars. Amtrak leased fifteen GE P30CH locomotives to SP to keep the commuter rail service running, but none of the GE engines were equipped with steam generators. After 1980, the SP fleet continued in leased service to the nascent state-run CalTrain service until the state of California ordered new EMD F40PH locomotives, which were delivered in 1985. Shortly after the introduction of the F40PHs in 1985, a brake issue was discovered, forcing the F40PHs to briefly run in tandem with an SP locomotive.

Passenger cars

The earlier wooden and steel-framed coaches were replaced with the all-steel 72-seat "Harriman" coaches starting in approximately 1900. SP introduced slightly longer all-steel 96-seat "Suburban" coaches in 1924, and continued to run them until the introduction of new state-owned equipment in 1985. The 1980 lease agreement between SP and the State of California showed a total of 83 passenger cars in revenue service: 27 operable "Suburbans", 10 "Suburbans" suitable for parts (nearly all "Suburbans" dating back to 1924), and 46 "Gallery" cars. , several "Harriman" and "Suburban" coaches survive (including all 27 operable "Suburbans"); thirteen "Suburbans" are still in revenue service for the Grand Canyon Railway, while others are in use on the Niles Canyon Railway, Sacramento Southern Railroad, Western Railway Museum, among others.

SP rolled out Pullman-built "Gallery" cars with two passenger decks in 1955; passengers on the upper deck sat on two balconies along the sides of the car, and the center aisle was open to allow conductors to check tickets on both levels without having to ascend stairs. 

A Streamline coach from the Daylight service was converted for Commute use in 1965 by adding five-abreast seating (one seat for two, and another seat for three across the aisle) for a total of 122 seats. It was not popular and was sold to the Stockton Terminal & Eastern in 1971. Instead, to increase passenger capacity, SP purchased a third flight of "Gallery" cars, delivered in 1968, which may be distinguished from the 1955/57 Gallery cars by a different window configuration. 

"Gallery" and "Subs" could be mixed to make up multi-car consists. In 1978, a Commute train had from one to nine cars, and were always led by a locomotive, meaning the locomotive needed to be turned at each terminal. With the introduction of new state-owned locomotives and rolling stock in 1985 capable of push-pull service, locomotives no longer needed to be turned.

Fares

Peninsula residents clamored for lower fares as early as 1908; SP officials replied by pointing out rates were already cheaper than similar services in New York, Boston, Philadelphia, Chicago, and Baltimore. A discount 10-ride ticket was introduced in 1909 to partially defray rates for frequent commuters. In 1910, SP added that rates across the Bay were comparable, and maintenance of the line between San Francisco and San Jose, partially paid by fares, was expensive. Although SP purchased the electric railway connecting Palo Alto and San Jose, bringing hope that it would be extended further north, it turned out the purchase was merely a strategy to eliminate competition.

When fares began to be regulated in 1912, associations in Peninsula cities and Santa Clara County filed complaints against SP, citing rates that were significantly higher than fares to Alameda County destinations of similar distance. The higher rates to Peninsula destinations was believed to cause slow growth of properties on the Peninsula. The suit was heard on August 26, 1912, and after it became clear that many cities felt the rates were excessive and that a rate cut would happen, SP asked for a continuance to put together a compromise.

Also in 1912, SP proposed that private club cars be provided on several morning trains to allow commuters to "enjoy a shave or shampoo and indulge in convival highball while making their daily trips to San Francisco."

See also
Bay Area Rapid Transit

References

External links
 
 
 
 

Public transportation in San Francisco
1863 establishments in California
Southern Pacific Railroad
1863 in rail transport